Cornell is a village in Livingston County, Illinois, United States. The population was 467 at the 2010 census.

Geography
Illinois Route 23 passes through the village, leading northwest  to Streator and southeast  to Pontiac, the Livingston county seat.

History

The modern town of Cornell is a blending of two towns founded at almost the same time. Both were attempting to attract a station on the new Fairbury Pontiac and Northwestern Railroad, which eventually became part of the Wabash Railroad. The town of Cornell was laid out by Walter P. Cornell (3 April 1811 – 5 May 1889) on 15 June 1871. The adjoining town of Amity was laid out two days later by Willard D. Blake (5 February 1840 – 1 June 1875). Walter Cornell was born in Rhode Island, came to Illinois in 1837, served three years as County Treasurer, and was a director of the railroad. Blake was a farmer born in LaSalle County, Illinois, who died at the age of 35. Ironically, while the name Cornell was kept by the new town, most of the early businesses were in the Amity part of the plat. Indeed, several early houses built in Cornell were soon moved a few blocks down to the Amity part of the town. Cornell was officially organized as a town in 1873. The original town of Cornell was centered on a block of public land, which is today called North Park. Neither original town had a railroad ground, but a small triangular “Public Ground” was later added. South Park dates from a later addition to the town. The town soon had several grocery stores, a bank, four churches, a stockyard, a harness shop and a newspaper, the Cornell Journal. The main businesses remaining in Cornell include Casey's General Store and Fortner's Pub. Cornell Grade School is the only school in town and the mascot is the cougar. Cornell students attend high school in Flanagan at Flanagan-Cornell High School.

Demographics

As of the census of 2000, there were 511 people, 205 households, and 142 families residing in the village. The racial makeup of the village was 98.83% White, 0.39% African American, 0.78% from other races. Hispanic or Latino of any race were 1.57% of the population.

There were 205 households, out of which 32.2% had children under the age of 18 living with them, 54.1% were married couples living together, 8.8% had a female householder with no husband present, and 30.7% were non-families. 28.3% of all households were made up of individuals, and 14.1% had someone living alone who was 65 years of age or older. The average household size was 2.49 and the average family size was 3.06.

In the village, the population was spread out, with 26.2% under the age of 18, 9.6% from 18 to 24, 23.3% from 25 to 44, 27.8% from 45 to 64, and 13.1% who were 65 years of age or older. The median age was 39 years. For every 100 females, there were 93.6 males. For every 100 females age 18 and over, there were 92.3 males.

The median income for a household in the village was $45,313, and the median income for a family was $51,429. Males had a median income of $39,375 versus $17,273 for females. The per capita income for the village was $18,655. About 8.3% of families and 8.8% of the population were below the poverty line, including 12.7% of those under age 18 and 11.6% of those age 65 or over.

References

Villages in Livingston County, Illinois
Villages in Illinois
Populated places established in 1871
1871 establishments in Illinois